Sergei Klischin (born 24 May 1967) is an Austrian judoka. He competed in the men's middleweight event at the 1996 Summer Olympics.

Achievements

References

External links
 

1967 births
Living people
Austrian male judoka
Olympic judoka of Austria
Judoka at the 1996 Summer Olympics
20th-century Austrian people
21st-century Austrian people